General Baranov may refer to:

Aleksandr Baranov (general) (born 1946), Russian Army general
Valery Baranov (soldier) (born 1948), Internal Troops of Russia colonel general
Viktor Ilyich Baranov (1906–1996), Soviet Army lieutenant general
Viktor Kirillovich Baranov (1901–1970), Soviet Army lieutenant general